Monty Python Live at City Center is a US-only live album by Monty Python, recorded at the New York City Center in April 1976 and rush released by Arista Records the following month. In order to get the album out in the shops quickly, the recordings were made early on in the run, where some of the performances were affected by faulty microphones. The team were joined onstage by regular actress Carol Cleveland and musician Neil Innes, who also performed in some sketches. 

The album was not released in the UK, due to its similarity to Live at Drury Lane. As with that album, Michael Palin provided new linking material.

A CD version was released in 1997.

Track listing

Side one
Introduction/The Llama
Gumby Flower Arranging
Short Blues
Wrestling
World Forum
Albatross/Colonel Stopping It
Nudge Nudge
Crunchy Frog
Bruces' Song
Travel Agent

Side two
Camp Judges
Blackmail
Protest Song
Pet Shop
Four Yorkshiremen
Argument Clinic
Death of Mary, Queen of Scots
Salvation Fuzz
Lumberjack Song

Monty Python Live at City Center was also broadcast on the King Biscuit Flower Hour radio show on 9 May 1976, with an introduction by John Cleese and Dave Herman.

Personnel 
 Graham Chapman
 John Cleese
 Terry Gilliam
 Eric Idle
 Terry Jones
 Michael Palin

Additional performers 
 Carol Cleveland
 Neil Innes

References

External links
This concert on the Concert Vault website - a slightly different version recorded on 23 April 1976.
The unreleased introduction by John Cleese and Dave Herman - hosted on YouTube by the Monty Python Museum.

Live at City Center
1976 live albums
Arista Records live albums